Nikolai Vladimirovich Nesterenko (born 17 December 1984) is a former Russian professional footballer.

Club career
He played 5 seasons in the Russian Football National League for FC Volgar Astrakhan and FC Khimik Dzerzhinsk.

Personal life
His younger brother Andrei Nesterenko also was a footballer.

External links

1984 births
People from Elista
Living people
Russian footballers
Association football midfielders
Kazakhstan Premier League players
FC Tekstilshchik Kamyshin players
FC Irtysh Pavlodar players
FC Taraz players
FC Volgar Astrakhan players
FC Elista players
FC Khimik Dzerzhinsk players
Russian expatriate footballers
Expatriate footballers in Kazakhstan
Russian expatriate sportspeople in Kazakhstan
Sportspeople from Kalmykia